Nikola Vukčević (born 22 March 1984) is a Montenegrin international footballer who plays for FK Lokomotiva Beograd in the Serbian League Belgrade as a defender.

International career
Vukčević made his debut for Montenegro in a November 2009 friendly match against Belarus, coming on as a final minute substitute for Miodrag Džudović. It remained his sole international appearance.

References

External links

 

1984 births
Living people
Footballers from Podgorica
Association football central defenders
Serbia and Montenegro footballers
Montenegrin footballers
Montenegro international footballers
FK Budućnost Podgorica players
KF Vllaznia Shkodër players
Ethnikos Achna FC players
Kazma SC players
FK Lovćen players
KF Shkëndija players
FK Inđija players
OFK Titograd players
Second League of Serbia and Montenegro players
First League of Serbia and Montenegro players
Kategoria Superiore players
Montenegrin First League players
Cypriot First Division players
Kuwait Premier League players
Macedonian First Football League players
Serbian First League players
Montenegrin expatriate footballers
Expatriate footballers in Albania
Expatriate footballers in Cyprus
Expatriate footballers in Kuwait
Expatriate footballers in North Macedonia
Expatriate footballers in Serbia
Montenegrin expatriate sportspeople in Albania
Montenegrin expatriate sportspeople in Cyprus
Montenegrin expatriate sportspeople in Kuwait
Montenegrin expatriate sportspeople in North Macedonia
Montenegrin expatriate sportspeople in Serbia